Jinkouhe is a district of the city of Leshan, Sichuan Province, China.

Sichuan Honghua Industrial Corporation (formerly the 814 Plant), a subsidiary of China National Nuclear Corporation is located in Heping Yi Autonomous Town in the district, thus the district is one of the few areas in China that are still closed to foreigners.

References

Districts of Sichuan
Leshan